Tough to Kill is a 1978 Italian action film shot in the Dominican Republic written and directed  by Joe D'Amato and starring Luc Merenda and Donald O'Brien.

Plot
A hit man joins a band of mercenaries for a mission in an African jungle during a civil war. His goal is to bring back a wanted mercenary dead or alive, for whom a huge reward has been offered. The members of the squad all wind up fighting with each other over the prize.

Cast

 Luc Merenda as Martin 
 Donald O'Brien as Major Hagerty 
  Percy Hogan as Wabu 
  Laurence Stark as Mike O’Sullivan
 Piero Vida as Leon
  Wolfango Soldati as Polansky
  Isarco Ravaioli as Cpt. Duscheff/Duchesne
 Alessandro Haber as Papadinos
  Lorenza Rodriguez Lopez as Stella

Release
The film soundtrack by Stelvio Cipriani was released on CD by Digitsoundtracks on 7 February 2019.

Reception
Director Joe D'Amato stated about the film in an interview, "The script was excellent, but due to some production mishaps, the resulting film was pretty average."

References

External links

1978 films
Films directed by Joe D'Amato
Macaroni Combat films
Films with screenplays by Sergio Donati
Films scored by Stelvio Cipriani
Films set in Africa
Films set in jungles
Films shot in the Dominican Republic
1970s crime action films
1970s Italian-language films
1970s Italian films